The Dhana Airstrip is located in Dhana, in Sagar District, Madhya Pradesh and is near to Sagar, Damoh, Khurai and Bina. Dhana airport is the home base of Chimes Aviation Academy (CAA). It has a 3000-foot asphalt runway with runway lights installed by CAA. The apron area can accommodate 10–12 small aircraft. It also has a helipad.

CAA operates seven Cessna 172s, one Piper Seneca and a DA 42 on this airfield. CAA have a 140 by 100 foot hangar in the airfield. Other than CAA, the airfield is often used by Madhya Pradesh Government Aviation and VIP charter aircraft as well as Medical evacuation flights.

Apart from a government rest house inside the airfield, a cafeteria and a visitors lounge of CAA are also available.

There are no radio navigation aids available, the runway orientation is 352–172 (35–17) and there was a 20–30 feet power line obstruction at the approach of runway 35 till 2012, which was later removed by replacing the overhead cable with an underground power cable under initiatives of Chimes Aviation Private Limited.

Night operations are limited to local training flights of CAA. Weather  is usually stable, with strong cross winds. The air traffic control (ATC) is staffed during normal working hours. The frequency is 122.6 Mhz.

External links
 DHANA AIRPORT VIEW

Defunct airports in India
Sagar, Madhya Pradesh
Damoh
Dhana
Year of establishment missing